Macrachaenium is a genus of flowering plants in the family Asteraceae.

Species
There is only one known species, Macrachaenium gracile, native to Chile (Biobío, La Araucania, Aisén, Los Lagos, Magallanes) and Argentina (Chubut, Neuquén, Rio Negro, Santa Cruz, Tierra del Fuego).

References

External links
Tree of Life Web Project

Nassauvieae
Monotypic Asteraceae genera
Flora of South America